606 Main Street is a historic commercial building located in Barnstable, Massachusetts.

Description and history 
Built in about 1910, it is a modest, single-story, wood-framed construction with a gable roof. The front slope of the roof has a long shed-roof dormer, providing some second-level storage space for the shops below. The building is vernacular in style, with paired recessed doorways to the stores. The building typifies Barnstable's modestly-scaled commercial district, fitting well with earlier residential structures.

The building was listed on the National Register of Historic Places on March 13, 1987.

See also
National Register of Historic Places listings in Barnstable County, Massachusetts

References

Commercial buildings on the National Register of Historic Places in Massachusetts
Buildings and structures in Barnstable, Massachusetts
National Register of Historic Places in Barnstable, Massachusetts
Buildings and structures completed in 1910
1910 establishments in Massachusetts